Eupithecia physocleora is a moth in the  family Geometridae. It is found on the Juan Fernandez Islands in Chile.

The forewings are greyish white, with numerous greyish brown and brown scales. The hindwings are white, with numerous dark scales. Adults have been recorded on wing in March.

References

Moths described in 1922
physocleora
Moths of South America
Endemic fauna of Chile